American football in North Central Pennsylvania has a historic past. Football is the predominant sport in the region of Pennsylvania dating back to the early days of the sport. All levels of football, including high school football and college football, are followed passionately. North Central Pennsylvania does not have any professional football franchises.

History

Early years (1870–1944) 

American football was first originated in the area in the late 1870s, when Pennsylvania State University and Bucknell University created programs.  The first local recorded game occurred on November 12, 1881, when Penn State traveled to Lewisburg, Pennsylvania to play Bucknell, known until 1886 as the University of Lewisburg. Penn State won 9–0, which was nine goals to none. At the time, this was really a game of "American rugby." Less than a year after this game some high Schools in the area adopted the game. The father of American football, Walter Camp, did not develop the "scrimmage", the "first down" and the "gridiron" (yard markings) until 1882. Although this game was reported in two State College newspapers and the Mirror (University of Lewisburg campus newspaper), Bucknell denies that this game ever happened. Most high school games were not recorded so a specific date on when high school football actually originated in the area.

With the creation of the Pennsylvania Interscholastic Athletic Association in 1913 and other high school sport governing bodies being founded more specific records and rules were being brought about between the years 1897 and 1920. The earliest recorded high school football game in the area took place in 1883 however the exact date was not found nor the schools involved as the box school only said "Green and Black" not school names, nicknames or mascots.

Massive growth (1945–1990) 
The sport in the area saw massive growth after World War II. During the next 40 years after the war, high schools and colleges saw a massive spike in participation and fan support. Mostly due to the increased presence of media and state playoffs. The playoff bracket and post-season games drew large numbers of fans and supporters. During the 60s, 70s and 80s the sport saw the most growth in the area. Most schools, even small rural schools had a football program.

During this time period is when most of the area's schools' rivalries came to fruition.

Modern years (1991–present) 
After the massive growth of the sport, football has continued its success in this region. Fans have continued to support their local schools or colleges in the area with a passion. Even though there is no professional franchise in the area many people root for either the Philadelphia Eagles or Pittsburgh Steelers.

Collegiate level football 
The following chart shows area colleges football programs.

High school level football 
Of the 102 public high schools in the area 101 have football programs (as of June 2017). Games are played on Fridays, however some games are played on Saturday possibly due to travel or other inconveniences. Programs play a total of eleven regular season games heading into playoffs. A possible four more games leading up to the state championship games now played at Hersheypark Stadium in Hershey, Pennsylvania. The location was chosen due to its centralized location within the state.

Notable players 
Many notable American football players were born and grew up in the North Central Pennsylvania region.
 Channing Crowder
 Robbie Gould
 Jonathan Stupar
 Nate Stupar
 Larry Johnson
 Ethan Kilmer

See also
 The Rivalry (Lafayette–Lehigh), (1884–present, except 1896)

References 

American football in Pennsylvania